Charlie Kelly may refer to:

People
Charlie Kelly (businessman) (born 1945), American businessman and mountain bike pioneer
Charlie Kelly (baseball), 19th-century baseball player
Charlie Kelly, former drummer with the rock group The Vaselines

Fictional characters
Charlie Kelly, a character in Fair City
Charlie Kelly (It's Always Sunny in Philadelphia), character on the sitcom It's Always Sunny in Philadelphia

See also
Charles Kelly (disambiguation)